The men's 1500 metres at the 2019 Asian Athletics Championships was held on 23 and 24 April.

Medalists

Results

Heats
Qualification rule: First 4 in each heat (Q) and the next 4 fastest (q) qualified for the final.

Final

References

1500
1500 metres at the Asian Athletics Championships